Leucoptera lathyrifoliella is a moth in the Lyonetiidae family. It is found in Finland, Germany and England.

The moth differs  from Leucoptera laburnella as follows : forewings with postmedian costal bar longer, touching yellow upper margin of post-tornal spot, dark edgings sharper-marked, apex of wing dark fuscous ; hindwings rather dark grey.

The larvae feed on Lathyrus linifolius, Lathyrus pratensis and Lathyrus sylvestris. They mine the leaves of their host plant. The mine has the form of a flat, upper-surface, oval blotch without a preceding gallery, with clear greenish frass. There may be more than one mine in a single leaflet sometimes merging. Pupation takes place outside of the mine.

References

External links
lepiforum de

Further reading

Leucoptera (moth)
Moths described in 1866
Moths of Europe